Saphira Indah Julianti (26 July 1986 – 30 January 2019) was an Indonesian actress. In 2003 she started her career in the Indonesian film industry with the film Eiffel... I'm in Love.

Indah died on 30 January 2019, from a lung infection. She was 6 months pregnant.

Filmography

Films

Television

References

External links
 

1986 births
2019 deaths
Indonesian film actresses
Indonesian television actresses
21st-century Indonesian actresses
People from Bandung
Deaths from lung disease